Cassidy Freeman (born April 22, 1982) is an American actress and musician. She is known for her roles as Tess Mercer in The CW's superhero drama Smallville, Amber Gemstone in the HBO series The Righteous Gemstones, and Cady Longmire in A&E's modern western Longmire.

Early life and education
Freeman was born in Chicago, Illinois, to prominent Chicago-area attorneys Glynna and Lee Freeman, who also own a cattle ranch in Montana. She is the youngest of four children, with three brothers, two of whom are voice actor Crispin Freeman and musician Clark Freeman. Her third brother Ryan is adopted. Her father is Jewish. Her mother has German, English, Scottish, and Irish ancestry.

Freeman graduated from The Latin School of Chicago, and then magna cum laude from Middlebury College in 2005 with degrees in theater and Spanish.

Career

Acting
Freeman has appeared in several shorts, feature films and television series. She starred in the thriller film YellowBrickRoad which was written and directed by Andy Mitton and Jesse Holland. Freeman also played the character Veronica Sharpe in the award-winning short film Razor Sharp. The film won "Best Action Film" at the 2007 Comic-Con International Independent Film Festival.
In September 2008, she began starring in The CW's Superman-inspired drama Smallville where she played Tess Mercer after the departure of Michael Rosenbaum's Lex Luthor and continued in this role until the show ended in May 2011.

Freeman has appeared three times in the CBS crime drama franchise CSI. In October 2009, she appeared in CSI: Crime Scene Investigation season 10, episode four, called "Coup de Grâce". In September 2011, she appeared in CSI: NY season 8, episode one, called "Indelible". In March 2012, she appeared in CSI: Miami season 10, episode fifteen, called "No Good Deed".

On January 13, 2012, Freeman was confirmed to be in The CW's fantasy drama The Vampire Diaries as Sage in the third season. Between 2012 and 2017, Freeman starred as Cady Longmire in the A&E and (later) Netflix crime drama Longmire.

Between 2016 and 2017, she played the Russian spy Eva Azarova in NCIS: New Orleans. She also starred in a crossover episode with its parent series NCIS. She co-starred alongside Will Patton in the fifth The Purge movie The Forever Purge, which was released in 2021.

Music
Freeman, her brother Clark Freeman, and Andy Mitton formed a band called The Real D'Coy, in which Freeman sings and plays the piano.

Allegations against Jeremy Piven
In November 2017, Freeman accused actor Jeremy Piven of predatory behavior. Freeman accused Piven of trying to do something to her when she was young. She came forward with her allegations after actress Ariane Bellamar accused Piven of sexual harassment.

Personal life
In January 2022 Freeman announced that she was expecting her first child with her boyfriend Ben Ellsworth. Their daughter, Gigi Kaya Ellsworth was born on 6 February 2022.

Philanthropy
Freeman is an active member of the Heal the Bay charity, which works toward cleaning up and protecting the West Coast waters. She also tutors children in Santa Monica as part of the Virginia Avenue Project.

Filmography

Film

Television

References

External links

 
 
 Cassidy Freeman interview  with BuddyTV (October 23, 2008).
 Cassidy Freeman interview with ACED Magazine (November 25, 2008).

1982 births
21st-century American actresses
Actresses from Chicago
American film actresses
American television actresses
Latin School of Chicago alumni
Living people
Middlebury College alumni
Singers from Chicago
21st-century American singers